Candace O'Connor is a St. Louis, Missouri-based freelance writer.

Career
Her recent book projects include a history of the Washington University School of Medicine Department of Neurology (2015); a history of the Washington University School of Medicine Department of Surgery (2014); a history of the Mallinckrodt Institute of Radiology (2012); a history of Northwest Community Hospital called Rooted in Community; Reaching New Heights (2009); a history of the George Warren Brown School of Social Work called What We Believe (2007); a history of Washington University in St. Louis titled Beginning a Great Work: Washington University, 1853-2003 (2004); a history of St. Louis Children's Hospital called Hope and Healing: St. Louis Children's Hospital, The First 125 Years (2006); Meet Me in the Lobby, The Story of Harold Koplar & the Chase Park-Plaza (2005); and A Song of Faith and Hope: The Life of Frankie Muse Freeman (2003).

In 2001, O'Connor won a regional Emmy Award for Oh Freedom After While: The Missouri Sharecropper Protest of 1939, a documentary film shown on PBS nationally that she produced with Steven J. Ross.  For more than two decades, her historical articles, profiles, medical articles, and other features have appeared in a variety of local and national publications.

O'Connor lives in St. Louis with her husband.  She is the sister of Kyrie O'Connor.

References

External links
Candace O'Connor's website

1950 births
Writers from Missouri
Living people
Washington University in St. Louis people